AoB Plants (AoBP) is a peer-reviewed open-access, non-profit scientific journal established in 2009 and publishing on all aspects of plant biology. The editor-in-chief is Tom Buckley (University of California, Davis) and the journal is published through Oxford University Press but owned and managed by the Annals of Botany Company a non-profit educational charity registered with the Charity Commission for England and Wales. AoBP was one of the first plant science journals to adopt a fully open access publishing model. An account of the thinking behind launching the journal and its progress over the first 10 years has been published. AoB Plants has two sister journals, Annals of Botany,  a subscription-based general botanical journal and in silico Plants, an open access journal devoted to all aspects of plant modelling.

Abstracting and indexing 
The journal is abstracted and indexed in:

According to Journal Citation Reports, the journal has a 2018 impact factor of 2.270, ranking it 77th out of 288 journals in the category "Plant Sciences" and 84th out of 165 journals in the category "Ecology".

References

External links 
 
 AoB Plants at SCImago Journal Rank
 AoB Plants at Botanical Scientific Journals

Creative Commons Attribution-licensed journals
English-language journals
Oxford University Press academic journals
Botany journals
Ecology journals
Publications established in 2009